Glenea taeniata is a species of beetle in the family Cerambycidae. It was described by James Thomson in 1860. It is known from Malaysia, Borneo and Sumatra.

Varietas
 Glenea taeniata var. sandakana Aurivillius, 1925
 Glenea taeniata var. sulla Aurivillius, 1925

References

taeniata
Beetles described in 1860